The following lists events in 2014 in Saudi Arabia.

Incumbents
Monarch: Abdullah
Crown Prince: Salman

Events

January
 January 20 - Two car bombs hit a rebel-held post on the Syrian border with Turkey, killing at least 16 people amidst continuing fighting between Turkey-supported rebels and Saudi-supported rebels.

February
 February 8 - A hotel fire in Medina, kills fifteen Egyptian pilgrims with 130 also injured.

March
 March 7 - The Saudi Arabian government designates the Muslim Brotherhood and al-Qaeda among others as terrorist groups and warns that people joining them could face 30 years in prison.
 March 27 - Prince Muqrin bin Abdulaziz Al Saud is confirmed as second-in-line to the Saudi Arabian throne.

April
 April 21 - Five people are sentenced to death and 37 others given prison sentences for their roles in the 2003 bombings in Riyadh.
 April 22 - The Health Minister of Saudi Arabia, Abdullah bin Abdulaziz Al Rabiah, is dismissed as the Middle East respiratory syndrome coronavirus rages in the nation, killing 81 people to date.
 April 27 - Saudi Arabia reports eight more deaths and 16 more cases in the latest outbreak of MERS.

May
 May 3 - The first U.S. case of MERS is reported in Munster, Indiana, of someone who travelled to Saudi Arabia.
 May 19 - Saudi Arabia closes its embassy in Tripoli over security concerns in Libya.

June
 June 3 - Saudi Arabia announces 113 previously unreported cases of MERS, revises the death toll to 282, and fires its minister of health.

July
 July 3 - Saudi Arabia deploys 30,000 soldiers to its border with Iraq after Iraqi government forces withdrew from the area.

August
 August 6 - Saudi Arabia grants Lebanon US$1 billion to help the country in its conflict with self-declared jihadist fighters on the border with Syria.
 August 6 - The World Health Organization reports that 932 have died from the latest outbreak of the Ebola virus with a man reportedly dying of the disease in Jeddah after a business trip to Sierra Leone.

September
 September 2 - Saudi Arabian authorities announce they have arrested 88 people on suspicions of being part of an al-Qaeda cell and plotting attacks inside and outside the kingdom.

October
 October 15 - Popular Saudi Shia Sheikh Nimr al-Nimr sentenced to death by Saudi court that tries terrorists and human rights activists.

December
 December 7 - The Saudi Interior Ministry arrests 135 on terrorism offences, including dozens suspected of links to Islamic State of Iraq and the Levant.

References

 
Years of the 21st century in Saudi Arabia
2010s in Saudi Arabia
Saudi Arabia
Saudi Arabia